Ogoki Lake is a lake in Thunder Bay District, Ontario, Canada.

See also
List of lakes in Ontario

References

 National Resources Canada

Lakes of Thunder Bay District